Accotink is an unincorporated community in Fairfax County, Virginia, United States. Accotink is located along Accotink Creek within Fort Belvoir.

See also
 Lake Accotink

References

Unincorporated communities in Fairfax County, Virginia
Unincorporated communities in Virginia
Washington metropolitan area